Odostomia verhoeveni is a species of sea snail, a marine gastropod mollusc in the family Pyramidellidae, the pyrams and their allies.

Description
The white, shiny shell has ta slender, elongate-conic  shape. The length of the shell varies between 1.8 mm and 1.8 mm. The whorls of the protoconch are helicoid. The teleoconch contains 4½ to 5 flat whorls. The almost horizontal suture is slightly channeled.  The sinuous growth lines are slightly opisthocline (i.e. following the growth direction) . The sculpture is almost smooth. There is a  faint spiral, microscopic striation. The outer lip is thin and smooth inside. There is sometimes a slight umbilical chink. The columellar tooth is well-developed, and situated deep inside the columella.

Distribution
This species occurs in the Atlantic Ocean off Mauritania.

References

External links
 To Encyclopedia of Life
 To World Register of Marine Species

verhoeveni
Gastropods described in 1998
Invertebrates of West Africa